Ross William Glendinning (born 17 September 1956) is a former Australian rules footballer who played for the East Perth Football Club in the West Australian National Football League (WANFL) and for the North Melbourne Football Club and the West Coast Eagles in the Victorian Football League (VFL).

Solidly built but agile and skilful in equal measure, Glendinning was considered one of the finest key-position players of his era. Inducted into the Australian Football Hall of Fame in 2000, he was West Coast's inaugural captain. The Ross Glendinning Medal is named in his honour and is awarded to the player judged best afield in the Western Australian derby between West Coast and Fremantle each AFL season.

Playing career
Glendinning started his senior football career with East Perth in the Western Australian National Football League (WANFL). He joined under the father–son rule, his father Gus having played 69 games for the Royals from 1941 to 1951. Ross played 56 games for East Perth from 1974 to 1977.

He joined North Melbourne in 1978, after being denied a clearance from East Perth in 1977. He twice won the club's Best and Fairest award and in 1983, winning the Brownlow Medal after finishing second the previous year. Strongly built, he could play at centre half-forward or centre half-back.

When  was formed in 1986, Glendinning returned to his home state and was appointed the club's inaugural captain. Playing mainly at centre half-forward, he was the club's leading goal kicker in 1987 and 1988.

Post-football career
Following retirement, Glendinning was an expert commentator for Channel 7 from 1989 till 1998 while also serving as a panelist on the sportsworld football panel.

In March 2000, while serving as 's match committee chairman, Glendinning attracted attention for making remarks on television claiming 's star full-forward Matthew Lloyd was suspect under physical pressure. Essendon coach Kevin Sheedy showed a video of the interview to his players in the lead-up to the match at Subiaco Oval. For the record, Essendon won the match by 36 points and would go on to claim the premiership at the end of the season, losing only one game along the way.

In recent years, Glendinning returned to the West Coast Eagles as corporate relations manager.

Honours
Glendinning has been inducted into the WA Hall of Champions (1994), the Australian Football Hall of Fame (2000), the WA Football Hall of Fame (2004) and the North Melbourne Hall of Fame (2012). He was named at centre half-back in the North Melbourne Football Club's Team of the Century. In addition, the Ross Glendinning Medal is named in his honour and is awarded to the player judged best afield in the West Australian derby between West Coast and Fremantle each AFL season.

He was the coach of the Western Australia Australian rules football team in the 1996 and 1997 State of Origin matches against South Australia and The Allies, losing both games.

Personal life
Glendinning is married to Kerry and has three daughters.

References

External links

Profile at WA Football Hall of Fame website
AFL Hall of Fame - Players

1956 births
Living people
East Perth Football Club players
West Coast Eagles players
North Melbourne Football Club players
Syd Barker Medal winners
Brownlow Medal winners
All-Australians (1953–1988)
Australian Football Hall of Fame inductees
Western Australian State of Origin players
Australian rules footballers from Perth, Western Australia
West Australian Football Hall of Fame inductees
People educated at Scotch College, Perth
Australia international rules football team players